Trechus ispulensis is a species of ground beetle in the subfamily Trechinae. It was described by Belousov & Kabak in 1992.

References

ispulensis
Beetles described in 1992